Gary Allen Haught (born September 29, 1970) is an American former professional baseball pitcher.

Haught attended Choctaw High School in Choctaw, Oklahoma and the University of Louisiana at Lafayette, where he pitched for the Louisiana-Lafayette Ragin' Cajuns baseball team.

Haught was drafted by the Oakland Athletics in the 22nd round (620th overall) of the 1992 Major League Baseball Draft.  He appeared in six games for the Athletics in 1997, pitching a total of  innings.

External links

1970 births
Living people
Alexandria Aces players
American expatriate baseball players in Canada
Atlantic City Surf players
Baseball players from Tacoma, Washington
Edmonton Trappers players
Greenville Bluesmen players
Huntsville Stars players
Louisiana Ragin' Cajuns baseball players
Madison Muskies players
Modesto A's players
Oakland Athletics players
Southern Oregon A's players
American expatriate baseball players in Taiwan
Mercuries Tigers players